Eurocat or EUROCAT may refer to:

 Eurocat (transport), air traffic control system
 EUROCAT (medicine), a European organization
 Eurocat, an animated cat and official mascot of the Eurovision Song Contest 1990